In mathematics, in particular in differential geometry, mathematical physics, and representation theory a Weitzenböck identity, named after Roland Weitzenböck, expresses a relationship between two second-order elliptic operators on a manifold with the same principal symbol. Usually Weitzenböck formulae are implemented for G-invariant self-adjoint operators between vector bundles associated to some principal G-bundle, although the precise conditions under which such a formula exists are difficult to formulate.  This article focuses on three examples of Weitzenböck identities:  from Riemannian geometry, spin geometry, and complex analysis.

Riemannian geometry
In Riemannian geometry there are two notions of the Laplacian on differential forms over an oriented compact Riemannian manifold M.  The first definition uses the divergence operator δ defined as the formal adjoint of the de Rham operator d:

The usual form Laplacian is then given by

On the other hand, the Levi-Civita connection supplies a differential operator

where ΩpM is the bundle of p-forms.  The Bochner Laplacian is given by

This is also known as the connection or rough Laplacian.

The Weitzenböck formula then asserts that

where A is a linear operator of order zero involving only the curvature.

The precise form of A is given, up to an overall sign depending on curvature conventions, by

where
R is the Riemann curvature tensor,
 Ric is the Ricci tensor,
  is the map that takes the wedge product of a 1-form and p-form and gives a (p+1)-form,
  is the universal derivation inverse to θ on 1-forms.

Spin geometry
If M is an oriented spin manifold with Dirac operator ð, then one may form the spin Laplacian Δ = ð2 on the spin bundle.  On the other hand, the Levi-Civita connection extends to the spin bundle to yield a differential operator

As in the case of Riemannian manifolds, let .  This is another self-adjoint operator and, moreover, has the same leading symbol as the spin Laplacian.  The Weitzenböck formula yields:

where Sc is the scalar curvature.  This result is also known as the Lichnerowicz formula.

Complex differential geometry
If M is a compact Kähler manifold, there is a Weitzenböck formula relating the -Laplacian (see Dolbeault complex) and the Euclidean Laplacian on (p,q)-forms.  Specifically, let
 and
 in a unitary frame at each point.

According to the Weitzenböck formula, if , then

where  is an operator of order zero involving the curvature.  Specifically, if  in a unitary frame, then  with k in the s-th place.

Other Weitzenböck identities
In conformal geometry there is a Weitzenböck formula relating a particular pair of differential operators defined on the tractor bundle.  See Branson, T. and Gover, A.R., "Conformally Invariant Operators, Differential Forms, Cohomology and a Generalisation of Q-Curvature", Communications in Partial Differential Equations, 30 (2005) 1611–1669.

See also
Bochner identity
Bochner–Kodaira–Nakano identity
Laplacian operators in differential geometry

References

Mathematical identities
Differential operators
Differential geometry